J. Murray Bartels (born Julius Murray Bartels; July 15, 1871 – October 5, 1944) was a  New York City-based dealer and auctioneer of rare postage stamps. He was also well known for his knowledge of United States postal stationery.

Family
Barthels was born in Warrenton, Fauquier County, Virginia, one of six or so siblings born to Hermann Friedrich Bartels and Sally Innes Bartels. His father was born in Germany.

Collecting interests

Bartels was primarily interested in United States postal stationery and became an expert on the subject. He published the result of his studies in J.M. Bartels and Co.'s Catalogue and Reference List of the Stamped Envelopes, Wrappers and Letter Sheets in 1897, and several editions of Envelopes of the United States, from 1910-38.

In 1943, he published a two volume set on stamped envelopes and wrappers.<ref>P.H. Thorp, ed.; Bartels Catalogue of the Stamped Envelopes and Wrappers of the United States and Possessions", Fifth Edition, 1943.</ref> He published philatelic literature on other philatelic subjects, such as, The Postage Stamps of the Philippines (co-authored with F.A. Foster and F.L. Palmer, in 1904), Bartel's Checklist of Canal Zone Stamps, in 1906 and 1908, and United States Virgin Islands'' (co-authored with Bertram William Henry Poole) in 1917.

Philatelic activity
Bartels conducted 337 philatelic auctions. Among his most important sales were portions of the significant portions of the Clarence Eagle and Arthur Hind prize-winning collections.

Honors and awards
Bartels was named to the American Philatelic Society Hall of Fame in 1946.

Legacy
Prescott Holden Thorp continued Bartels work with his publishing of "Thorp-Bartels" catalog editions.

See also
 Philately
 Philatelic literature
 J. Murray Bartels profile, archive.org; accessed December 18, 2017.

References

1871 births
1944 deaths
Philatelic literature
American philatelists
American stamp dealers
People from Warrenton, Virginia
Businesspeople from New York City
American Philatelic Society
Place of death missing
American people of German descent